Krishnopokkho ("The Dark Lunar Fortnight") is a 2016 Bangladeshi Bengali language romance drama film based on novel of the same name written by Humayun Ahmed. The film's adapted screenplay was written and directed by Meher Afroz Shaon and starring Riaz, Tania Ahmed, Ferdous Ahmed, Wahida Mollick Jolly and Faruque Ahmed. This is the debut film by the director. The storyline revolves around two star-crossed lovers who are not destined to be together.

The film nationwide released on February 26, 2016, which was produced by Impress Telefilm Limited and distributed by Jaaz Multimedia The film had its closing premiere at the 11th Geneva International Oriental Film Festival (FIFOG) at the Grutli Theatre on April 17, 2016. In May 2016, the film had its opening premiere at 17th Rainbow Film Festival at London on May 29, 2016.

Plot
Aru marries Muhib without the consent from any of the family. After marriage they go to Muhib's friend 's place. Muhib tries to manage a job for him while Aru's family thinks otherwise and the story turns into a new way.

The story revolves around the love-story of Muhib and Oru where both being together are not together. Muhib is brought up in his brother-in-law's home with his sister. Muhib and his sister came from a rural family. His sister married an elite bourgeois man, who is strict and robotic, rather than humane. His sister and brother-in-law have one daughter named Sara. The family seems fine, yet lacks of love and affection. Muhib is always afraid of his brother-in-law who is fatherly in rudeness, without any single affection. Being in love with Oru, Muhib married her without informing anyone all of a sudden. Oru's family didn't know as well. Just after their marriage, Muhib's brother-in-law offered him a job out of the city. On his way, he had a terrible car accident which brought disaster to all and twisted the stream of all characters. Muhib's sister, being shocked, for the first time, raised voice against her husband and insulted him about his non-human behaviour all through the life. On the other hand, Oru's family already fixed a groom for Oru and they were unknown of Oru's marriage with Muhib. However, in the end, when Oru was informed about the accident, she couldn't help but reveal their secret marriage. At first it was thought that Oru's marriage with Muhib should never be revealed as Oru must start a new life. But Oru, when heard the news, rushed to the hospital and desired to be Muhib's wife forever waiting for his return from Coma.

Cast

 Riaz as Muhib
 Ferdous Ahmed as Abrar
 Tania Ahmed as Zeba
 Wahida Mollick Jolly as Rahela
 Faruque Ahmed as Lina's Father
 Masud Akhond as Liyakat
 Moutushi Biswas as Miru
 Mahiya Mahi as Aru
 Azad Abul Kalam as Shafiq
 Kayes Chowdhury as Jamil Chowdhury
 Rafikullah Selim as Driver Mohsin
 Jhuna Chowdhury as Kazi Shaheb
 Arfan Ahmed as Bozlu
 Tarek Swapan
 Jayita Mahalanobish as Bozlu's Wife
 Ehsanur Rahman
 Ainun Putul as Lina's Mother
 Rimu Roja Khandaker as Moyna'r Ma
 Puja Cherry
 Labonno Chowdhury as Priyodarshini / Sara
 Tuktuki
 Tamim Iqbal
 Ariya
 Dr. Azad as Doctor-2
 Dr. Alamgir as Senior Doctor
 Mintu Sarder
 Motiul Alam Moti
 Babon
 Bipul
 Ebadul Islam Mehedi
 Nur-Nobi Chowdhury
 Emdad Khan Himu
 Guest Appearance
 Jayanta Chattopadhyay as Zeba's Maternal Uncle
 Shadhin Khosru as Doctor-1

Music

Release
Impress Telefilm Limited produced the film and handling its release with Jaaz Multimedia. The film premiered on February 26, 2016, after an invitation-only screening on February 13, 2016, at the Balaka Cineworld, Dhaka. On March 23, 2016, the film released in Singapore. The film premiered on April 17, 2016, at the 11th Geneva International Oriental Film Festival in Switzerland. On April 22, 2016, the film premiered in France as the title Le Sombre Quinzaine and on May 21, 2016, in the United States.

Awards
 Bangladesh National Film Awards 2016
 Best Actress in a Supporting Role
 Best Female Playback Singer

References

External links
 Official website
 
 Krishnopokkho on YouTube
 

2016 films
2016 romantic drama films
Bangladeshi romantic drama films
Bengali-language Bangladeshi films
Films based on Bangladeshi novels
Films based on romance novels
Films set in Bangladesh
Films scored by S I Tutul
2010s Bengali-language films
Impress Telefilm films